Roy Ziv (born August 20, 1991), is a Canadian guitarist, YouTuber, and producer. Known for his videos performing guitar solos over pop songs and his work with Queen Extravaganza, Ziv released his first EP Distant Visions in September of 2020.

Early life
Born in 1991 in Israel, Ziv began playing music at a young age before moving to Canada in 1999. After finishing high school in 2009 Ziv traveled to Ramat Hasharon where he was enrolled in Rimon School of Music, and in 2010 was accepted into Berklee College of Music.

Career
In 2011 Ziv was selected as a finalist in the Queen Extravanganza competition formed by Roger Taylor in honor of the band's 40th anniversary. In 2017 Ziv joined JTC Guitar as a masterclass instructor and shortly after began work with Positive Grid showcasing their Spark amplifier. In October of 2020 Ziv hosted the Global Connections: Audience Building and Entrepreneurship webinar for Berklee.

Musical style
Although musically diverse Ziv is often compared to virtuoso guitarists Joe Satriani and Steve Vai for his soundscapes and shredding. In addition to guitar (most notably his 2005 Music Man Silhouette Special), Ziv is also a proficient pianist.

Discography 
Albums
 Distant Visions EP (2020)

Singles
 Currents (2020)
 Showtime (2018)
 Defying Gravity (2017)
 Leap Of Faith (2016)

As featured artist

As writer

References

External links 
 Artist Website
 YouTube Channel

1991 births
Living people